Alexander Preibisch (born 30 April 1991) is a German professional ice hockey player. He is currently playing under contract with Bietigheim Steelers in the Deutsche Eishockey Liga (DEL). He previously played six seasons in the DEL with Düsseldorfer EG.

References

External links
 

1991 births
Living people
SC Bietigheim-Bissingen players
DEG Metro Stars players
Düsseldorfer EG players
German ice hockey right wingers
Sportspeople from Cologne